Events in the year 1893 in Belgium.

Incumbents
Monarch - Leopold II
Prime Minister: Auguste Marie François Beernaert

Events

 12–18 April – general strike to demand universal manhood suffrage.
 15 April – Social-Christian Christene Volkspartij founded
 12 August – First Paris–Brussels road cycle race

Publications
Periodicals
 Annuaire de la section d'art et d'enseignement de la maison du Peuple
 Van Nu en Straks begins publication

Reference and reports
 Biographie Nationale de Belgique, vol. 12.
 Chemins de fer, postes, télégraphes, téléphones et marine. Compte rendu des opérations pendant l'année 1892 (Brussels, J. Goemaere)
 Arthur Van Gehuchten, L'Anatomie du système nerveux de l'homme (Leuven)

Literature
 Cyriel Buysse, Het recht van de sterkste
 Guido Gezelle, Tijdkrans
 Prosper de Haulleville, Portraits et silhouettes, vol. 2
 Émile Verhaeren, Les campagnes hallucinées (Brussels, Edmond Deman)

Art and architecture

 Les XX disband
 La Libre Esthétique founded

Buildings
 Victor Horta, Hôtel Tassel completed

Paintings
 Eugène Laermans, Evening strike

Performances
 17 May – Premiere of Maurice Maeterlinck's Pelléas et Mélisande

Births
 2 January – Félix Sellier, cyclist (died 1965)
 12 January – Victor Lenaers, cyclist (died 1968)
 20 February – Gabrielle Petit, patriot (died 1916)
 23 March
Robert de Foy, head of the State Security Service (died 1960)
René Vermandel, cyclist (died 1958)
 4 September – Robert Poulet, writer (died 1989)
 13 October – René Goormaghtigh, engineer (died 1960)
 23 October – Jean Absil, composer (died 1974)
 11 November – Paul van Zeeland, politician (died 1973)
 9 December – Prosper Dezitter, collaborationist (died 1948)

Deaths
 23 January – Eugène-François de Block (born 1812), artist
 27 January – Alfred Belpaire (born 1820), locomotive engineer
 28 January – Gustave Léonard de Jonghe (born 1829), painter
 24 May – Félix Nève (born 1816), Orientalist
 11 July – Eugène Simonis (born 1810), sculptor
 7 November – Constant Lievens (born 1856), Jesuit priest
 20 November – Léopold Harzé (born 1831), sculptor

References

 
1890s in Belgium